Curry is a village and townland in County Sligo, Ireland.

The local Roman Catholic church (the Church of the Immaculate Conception) was built , and the former national school (now disused) was built in 1883.

References

Townlands of County Sligo